Tottenham Hotspur F.C. Women, commonly referred to as Tottenham or Spurs, is an English women's football club affiliated with Tottenham Hotspur. The club currently plays in the FA WSL, the top flight of women's football in England. The club gained promotion for the 2019–20 FA WSL season after finishing second in the 2018–19 FA Women's Championship. 

Tottenham Hotspur plays its home games at Brisbane Road in Leyton, and occasionally at the Tottenham Hotspur Stadium. The club has been training full-time at Hotspur Way since 2020.

The Women's First Team is accommodated at the Club's main training centre in Enfield, alongside its men's teams, while attracting players of international calibre. It plays its home matches at Leyton Orient's Brisbane Road stadium, while also regularly playing matches at Tottenham Hotspur Stadium - the first of which drew a record breaking attendance of 38,262 in November 2019.

Rehanne Skinner was appointed as Head Coach of Tottenham Hotspur Women in November 2020, and - in her first full season in charge - led the Club to a historic highest-ever WSL finish and its first ever semi-final of a major cup competition. 

In January, 2023, Tottenham Hotspur Women broke the WSL record for highest transfer fee paid when England international, Bethany England, arrived from Chelsea Women on a contract until June 2026. 

The Club has developed a Female Talent Pathway, enabling it to work with local grassroots clubs to identify talented female players and provide them with a progressive series of footballing programmes to develop their game and help them play at the highest level possible. Football Development Centres for women are delivered in partnership with Barnet & Southgate College and New City College. Students on the programme are able to study academic subjects at the colleges while training three times a week, playing competitive football matches and accessing physiotherapy and strength and conditioning services

The club have won twelve trophies, the most recent being the overall FA Women's Premier League in the 2016–17 season.

History

Early years and amateur era (1985–2017) 
In 1985, the club was founded as Broxbourne Ladies by Sue Sharples and Kay Lovelock, following the folding of East Herts College. Permission was obtained to change the club's name to Tottenham Hotspur Ladies F.C. in the 1991–92 season. The reserve team started in 1992–93. In the 1996–97 season, the club's teams started playing in the national division. In the 2015–16 season, the club completed a historic double as they won the Ryman's Women's Cup and the FA Women's Premier League Cup.  In the same season they finished runners up in the Capital Cup nearly completing a cup treble. The following season was the team's most successful, claiming the quadruple including winning promotion to the WSL 2.

Modern Era

Promotion campaigns (2017–2019) 
At the start of the 2017–18 campaign, the club made high-profile signings such as former England U20 midfielder Coral-Jade Haines and Wales international forward Sarah Wiltshire. The season saw the team claim their first ever victory over a top flight side, beating Bristol City in their FA Women's League Cup matchup. The club finished their first season in a professional league in seventh place out of ten sides. In March 2018 it was confirmed that the club would apply to remain in the newly re-branded Women's Championship and would compete in the upcoming season. There were several moves in made the lead up to their first season in the newly reformed Championship, this included the return of Welsh international Megan Wynne who played on loan for the club in 2015 as well as the departure of long time players Katie O’Leary and Shannon Moloney who played for the side for five and seven years respectively. The club announced on 26 April 2019, that the team would be renamed to Tottenham Hotspur Women starting with the next season as well as the appointment of Heather Cowan as Head of Women's Football. After a 1–1 draw with Aston Villa on 1 May 2019, Spurs secured a promotion spot to the FA Women's Super League for the first time in their history. Their licence for the top flight was officially confirmed on 10 May 2019.

Women's Super League and professionalisation 
On 17 November 2019, the North London derby against Arsenal Women at the Tottenham Hotspur Stadium recorded an attendance figure of 38,262, the highest ever for a Women's Super League match.

In the 2020 summer transfer window Spurs reinforced their squad with a mix of players with WSL and NWSL experience. On 12 September, 2020, United States women's national team forward Alex Morgan signed with Spurs on a contract that reportedly ran from September through December 2020, with an option to extend the deal through the end of the 2020–21 FA WSL season. Still trying to regain fitness having not played since August 2019 and giving birth in May 2020, Morgan eventually made her Spurs debut nearly two months after signing, on 7 November, appearing as a 69th minute substitute in a 1–1 WSL draw against Reading. Spurs had started the season winless in their first seven matches, just one spot above last place and relegation. Due to this form, Rehanne Skinner was appointed as the new head coach of Tottenham on 19 November 2020, replacing long time managers Karen Hills and Juan Amorós. Hills had been in charge of the first team since August 2009 while Spurs were playing in the then-third tier South East Combination Women's Football League and Amoros joined the club soon after in February 2011. On 6 December 2020 in Skinner's first match in charge, Spurs took their first league win of the season with a 3–1 victory over Brighton & Hove Albion. The match also featured Morgan's first goal for the club, an 84th-minute penalty. On 21 December, Tottenham Hotspur announced that Morgan would end her contract with the club and return to the US. Spurs would finish the season in 8th place, well clear of relegation and just a place under their initial WSL finish in the 2019–20 FA WSL season.

Highest ever WSL finish

Skinner's first full season in charge of Spurs would see the team reach new heights and accomplish team firsts. Spurs' second match of the 2021–22 season on 12 September saw them beat Manchester City for the first time in team history. The defeat was City's first at home in the WSL since April 2018. The win resulted in Spurs taking points from any member of the "top four," the other three sides being Arsenal, Chelsea, and Manchester United. That November Spurs would take their first ever point from Manchester United and Arsenal after drawing 1–1 against both sides in consecutive matches.  Spurs had not taken any points against United since the teams first faced off in the 2018–19 FA Women's Championship season. Spurs' League Cup campaign saw them advance out of the group stage for the first time. Spurs would beat Liverpool in the quarter-finals to advance to their first ever semi-final in any major cup competition, but would bow out after a loss to eventual champions Manchester City. Spurs finished the season in 5th place, their highest ever WSL finish in club history. Following the end of the season Spurs confirmed the departures of Rachel Williams, Angela Addison, and Josie Green. The trio had each joined the club at a different level of the pyramid, Williams in the first division WSL, Addison in the second division Championship, and former captain Green was the last player who featured in the third division, joining the team ahead of Spurs' quadruple and promotion winning 2016–17 FA Women's Premier League season.

Kit

Kit suppliers and shirt sponsors

Stadium 
Tottenham Hotspur Ladies moved home grounds to Cheshunt in 2016, moving from Barrows Farm Stadium, the home of Harlow Town F.C. However, the alternative first team stadium stayed the same, as Goffs Lane. On 5 June 2019, the club announced that their 2019–20 season home matches will be played at The Hive Stadium. On 6 June 2022, the club announced that their 2022–23 season home matches would be played at Brisbane Road.

The women's team have had matches at both White Hart Lane and Tottenham Hotspur Stadium. Their final match at White Hart Lane on 19 April 2017 saw them win the FA Women's Premier League South title against rivals West Ham United Ladies.

Training ground 
The women's team began training full-time at Hotspur Way, the club's main facilities, in December 2020. The women's team had previously trained there once a week, with the rest of the time spent at The Hive Stadium.

Collaborations 
Tottenham Hotspur Women work closely with the Tottenham Hotspur men's first team, such as when supporting CoppaFeel!, a breast cancer awareness charity, and when promoting the Stonewall (charity) Rainbow Laces campaign.

Players

First-team squad

Out on loan

}

Former players

Management and support staff

Honours

First team 

 FA Women's Premier League
 Championship Play-off Winners (1): 2016–17
 FA Women's Premier League Southern Division
 Winners (1): 2016–17
 FA South-East Combination
 Winners (1): 2010–11
 London and South-East Regional Women's Football League – Premier Division
 Winners (1): 2007–08
 Greater London Regional Women's League – Division 1
 Winners (1): 1997–98
 London County Senior Cup
 Winners (1): 2011–12
 Greater London Regional Women's League Cup
 Winners (1): 1995–96
 Russell Cup
 Winners (1): 1997–98
 Ryman's Women's Cup
 Winners (2): 2015–16, 2016–17
FA Women's Premier League Cup
Winners (1): 2015–16, 2016–17

Reserves 

 Capital Women's Intermediate Cup
 Winners (1): 2016–17
 FA Women's Premier League Reserve Cup
 Winners (1): 2016–17
 FA Women's Premier League Reserve Southern Division
 Winners (1): 2016–17
 Greater London Regional Women's League – Reserve Division 1
 Winners (1): 2006–07
 London County Junior Cup
 Winners (1): 2012–13
 Sue Sharples Memorial Trophy
 Winners (2): 1995–95, 2006–07

Youth team 
 Greater London Regional Women's League – Reserve Division 3 (West)
 Winners (1): 1997–98
 Greater London Regional Women's League – Reserve Division 2
 Winners (1): 2003–04

Teams 
Tottenham Hotspur Women. has numerous teams; which are listed below:

 First team
 Reserves
 Thirds
 Academy
 Under 17
 Under 15
 Under 14 Blues
 Under 14 Whites
 Under 13 FDP
 Under 13 ECGFL
 Under 11 FDP
 Under 11 ECGFL
 Under 10

Academy 
Tottenham Hotspur Women also run a football academy in partnership with Barnet and Southgate College for girls aged 16–19.

WSL Academy is an U21s team which plays in the WSL Academy fixtures North & South and acts as a pathway to the First Team for those talented players.

See also 
 Tottenham Hotspur F.C.

References

External links 

 Official website

  

1985 establishments in England
Association football clubs established in 1985
Women's football clubs in England
Tottenham Hotspur F.C.
Women's football clubs in London
FA Women's National League teams
Women's Championship (England) teams